The Academy of the Guarani Language is a Paraguayan institution that promotes and regulates the Guarani language, one of the official languages of Paraguay and the Mercosur.

References

External links 
 Website of the Academy of the Guarani Language   

Guarani languages
Language regulators
Cultural organisations based in Paraguay
2013 establishments in Paraguay
Organizations established in 2013